Mignard is a French surname. Notable people with the surname include:

François Mignard (born 1949), French astronomer
12898 Mignard, main belt asteroid discovered by François Mignard
Nicolas Mignard (1606–1668), French painter
Paul Mignard (1639–1691), French painter and etcher
Pierre Mignard (1612–1695), French painter 
Pierre II Mignard (1640-1725), French painter and architect

French-language surnames